Antanambao Mahatsara is a rural commune (municipality) located in the Atsinanana region of eastern Madagascar, and belongs to the Vatomandry (district).

Agriculture is the base of economy, including coffee and rice. Also mais and manioc are grown.

References

Populated places in Atsinanana